Alternative frequency (or AF) is an option that allows a receiver to re-tune to a different frequency that provides the same station, when the first signal becomes too weak (e.g. when moving out of range). This is often used in car stereo systems, enabled by Radio Data System (RDS), or the U.S.-based Radio Broadcast Data System (RBDS).

Radio technology